An audience is: 
 a person or group of (usually) people viewing a show (film, play, performance)
 the group to which a work—such as a publication, performance, or work of art—is directed. Target audience.

Audience or The Audience may also refer to:
 Audience (meeting), a formal meeting between a head of state and another person
 Audience measurement

Media and communications
 Audience (company), a voice-processing company based in the U.S. state of California
 Audience (magazine), an American literary journal
 Audience (TV network), a former American satellite television channel

Music
 Audience (band), a cult British art rock band which existed between 1969 and 1972, and again between 2004 and 2013
 Audience (album), 1969
 theaudience, a British Britpop band of the 1990s
Theaudience (album), 1998
 The Audience (band), a German post-punk band
 "Audience" (Ayumi Hamasaki song), 2000
 "Audience" (Cold War Kids song), 2009

Plays
 Audience (Havel play), a 1975 play by Václav Havel
 Audience (play), a 1991 play by Michael Frayn
 The Audience (1930 play), a 1930 play by Federico García Lorca
 The Audience (2013 play), a 2013 play by Peter Morgan

See also
 Audience of One (disambiguation)